Riaan is a generally male given name, popular in South Africa. It is also a Hindu male given name meaning 'Little King'. Notable people with the name include:

 Riaan Botha (born 1970), South African pole vaulter
Riaan Fitzgerald, a South African creative designer
 Riaan Cruywagen (born 1945), South African television news reader and voice artist
 Riaan Engelbrecht, South African rugby league player
 Riaan Liebenberg, South African athlete
 Riaan Manser (born 1973), South African pioneering explorer
 Riaan Schoeman (born 1989), South African swimmer
 Riaan Smit (born 1984), South African rugby union footballer
 Riaan Vermeulen (born 1984), South African rugby union player
 Riaan Viljoen (born  1983), South African rugby union rugby player
 Riaan Walters (born 1980), Namibian cricketer
 Riaan van Zyl (born 1972), American rugby union player

See also
 Adriaan
 Rian
 Rhian